Predazzo (literally big meadow) is a village and comune in the province of Trento,  northern Italy. Predazzo is located about 58 kilometres northeast of Trento in Val di Fiemme.

It is one of the main centers of Val di Fiemme (the other is Cavalese), being the most populous and widespread of the valley. It is an important road junction and trade between the valleys of Fiemme and Fassa and the area of Primiero.

Predazzo is also the home of Pastificio Felicetti, a maker of pasta.

Geography

Territory & climate 
Predazzo borders with the following municipalities: Moena, Tesero, Panchià, Ziano di Fiemme, Siror, Canal San Bovo, Nova Levante and Nova Ponente.
Located at the confluence of the river Travignolo from the Dolomite Group of the Pale di San Martino, in the river Avisio, from the top of the Marmolada, it is the most upstream of the Val di Fiemme.

The city of Predazzo is part of the Natural park, Parco Naturale Paneveggio - Pale di San Martino, Magnifica Comunità di Fiemme and Comprensorio della Valle di Fiemme (C1).

Morphology and geology 
The characteristic morphology of Predazzo was originated around 200 million years ago, when a volcano collapsed. The territory then changed shape due to different atmospheric phenomena (e.g. erosion, glaciation). Predazzo is consequently located in the core of the Dolomites, between Lagorai, Latemar and Pale di San Martino mountain groups - which are part of the Dolomites recognised by UNESCO as World Heritage Site.

At the beginning of the 18th century, the Italian geologist Giuseppe Marzari Pencati noticed that granite, lava and marine sediment were altogether present in this area. The discovery of geology's value in the Dolomites attracted more and more scientists and researchers from all Europe, making Predazzo become an important destination for geology. Among the list of names: A. von Humboldt, F. von Richthofen, D. de Dolomieu, M.M. Gordon.

Hamlets and places
Predazzo is divided in 8 neighborhoods and has 6 hamlets: Bellamonte, Paneveggio, Mezzavalle, Fol, Coste and Zaluna. 
Pè de Pardac (Piè di Predazzo) is the historic center and it is located between Sommavilla and Molin. 
Molin is located on the west part of Predazzo, at the foot of Pelenzana, and takes its name from the presence of mills and canals in the early twentieth century. Before the advent of the electric light, in fact, many manufacturers took advantage of the hydraulic force on the course of the water conveyed in canals.

Somaìla (Sommavilla), situated near the square, is considered part of the old town and marks the end of the valley Travignolo.

Poz is a very recently district, close to the municipal aqueduct north of Predazzo and at the foot of Mount Mulat. Adjacent at it there is Birreria that take the name because of the presence of a brewery (now closed) near the exit to the north of Predazzo. 
Borgonuovo appears to be the newest part of Predazzo. New houses built close to the horse racing and football fields. It is located south of Predazzo.

Main sight
Predazzo is home of a Geological Museum of the Dolomites, which offers guests the opportunity to learn about the geological and mineralogical properties of this alpine territory. There are also relevant educational and cultural itineraries, such as the GeoTrail Dòs Capèl, that is the oldest path of Italy that focuses on geology.

On the road from the town to Passo Rolle is the Forte Dossaccio, and Austrian fortification from World War I.

Traditional events 

There are also different traditional events during the year:

 Catanaoc 'n festa, that consists of gastronomic festival and historic commemoration.
 Saint Martin's fireworks (11 November), that's celebrated with huge bonfires and a cortége.
 Saint James' market (25 July)
 The Desmontegada de le Vache (beginning of October), an episode of alpine transhumance where the livestock is brought back to the valleys after the summer season on high pastures.

Twin towns
 Hallbergmoos, Germany, since 1994
 Ferrere, Italy, since 2005 (friendship)

Ski jumping

The ski jumping and the ski jumping part of nordic combined was held here at the FIS Nordic World Ski Championships 1991 and FIS Nordic World Ski Championships 2003. And it is again at the ongoing FIS Nordic World Ski Championships 2013.

People
Ivo Pertile, ski jumper

References

External links
 Official website 

Cities and towns in Trentino-Alto Adige/Südtirol
Ski areas and resorts in Italy